Black Drama Anthology is a 1971 collection of plays solely written by Black American playwrights. The anthology was edited by Woodie King Jr, a Black American stage producer and Ron Milner, a Black American playwright. Writer Langston Hughes, Jazz musician Archie Shepp and writer Imamu Amiri Baraka appear in this collection, among others. Black Drama Anthology opens with a foreword by the editors King and Milner which outlines the motivations behind this collection, in which they write, "...recognizing all of this, and understanding that if we blacks are to have a theater in our own image, according to our own views, then we blacks will have to say which plays are in those images and of those views, we have here compiled an anthology of works by twenty-two of the best black playwrights...Twenty-three selections from an immensely rich field of talented black artists forging new, unique, and viable theater."

Themes 
This collection explores an array of themes connected to Black American life. Many of the included works contain elements of social criticism and messages of anti-racism. All but one were written in the early 1970s a "a socially and politically dynamic moment in the nation's history and a renaissance decade for black theater."

Works Included in Anthology 

 Junkies are Full of (Shhh….) by Imamu Amiri Baraka
 Bloodrites by Imamu Amiri Baraka
 Junebug Graduates Tonight by Archie Shepp
 The Corner by Ed Bullins
 Who’s Got His Own by Ron Milner
 Charades on East Fourth Street by Lonne Elder
 Gabriel by Clifford Mason
 Brotherhood by Douglas Turner Ward
 The One by Oliver Pitcher 
 The Marriage by Donald Greaves
 The Owl Killer by Philip Hayes Dean 
 Requiem for Brother X by William Wellington Mackey
 Ododo by Joseph A. Walker 
 All White Caste by Ben Caldwell 
 Mother and Child by Langston Hughes
 The Breakout by Charles (Oyamo) Gordon
 Three X Love by Ron Zuber
 A Medal for Willie by William Branch 
 Ladies in Waiting by Peter DeAnda
 Black Cycle by Martie Charles 
 Strictly Matrimony by Errol Hill
 Star of the Morning by Loften Mitchell
 Toe Jam by Elaine Jackson

Reception 
The collection was met with mixed review, primarily in the realm of critical scholarship.

References

1971 anthologies
American anthologies
African-American literature
African-American plays
Civil rights movement in popular culture
Books of plays